Pigeon is an unincorporated community in Jackson Township, Spencer County, in the U.S. state of Indiana.

History
A post office was established at Pigeon in 1883, and remained in operation until 1920. The community took its name from the nearby Little Pigeon Creek.

Geography

References

Unincorporated communities in Spencer County, Indiana
Unincorporated communities in Indiana